Lewes Road railway station was a railway station in Brighton, East Sussex. It was located on the now closed Kemp Town branch line which first opened in 1869. The station opened on 1 September 1873 and was closed to passengers in 1933  but the line remained opened for goods trains until 1971.

The layout of the station was quite unusual, as the single track that passed through it had a platform either side of it linked by a footbridge. Entry to the station was via a covered staircase situated next to the first arch of the viaduct across Lewes Road.

After the station was closed to passengers the platform buildings were used as a pickle factory, before being demolished during the 1950s. The platforms were intact when the line was completely closed in 1971. The site was redeveloped during the 1980s and no trace of the station now remains.

References 

Disused railway stations in Brighton and Hove
Former London, Brighton and South Coast Railway stations
Railway stations in Great Britain opened in 1873
Railway stations in Great Britain closed in 1917
Railway stations in Great Britain opened in 1919
Railway stations in Great Britain closed in 1933
Buildings and structures demolished in 1971